London Has Fallen is a 2016 American action thriller film directed by Babak Najafi and written by Creighton Rothenberger, Katrin Benedikt, Chad St. John, and Christian Gudegast. It is the second installment in the Has Fallen film series, the sequel to Antoine Fuqua's 2013 film Olympus Has Fallen and stars Gerard Butler, Aaron Eckhart, and Morgan Freeman, with Alon Moni Aboutboul, Angela Bassett, Robert Forster, Jackie Earle Haley, Melissa Leo, Radha Mitchell, Sean O'Bryan, Waleed Zuaiter, and Charlotte Riley in supporting roles. The film follows a plot to assassinate the world leaders of the G7 as they attend the British Prime Minister's funeral in London and Secret Service agent Mike Banning's efforts to protect United States President Benjamin Asher from being killed by terrorists.

Filming began in London on October 24, 2014. A Christmas break started in November with filming resuming in February 2015. The film was released by Focus Features under their recently revived Gramercy Pictures label on March 4, 2016, and grossed $205 million worldwide.

A third film, titled Angel Has Fallen, was released on August 23, 2019.

Plot
G7 intelligence services locate Pakistani arms trafficker and terrorist mastermind Aamir Barkawi at his compound, and authorize a US Air Force drone strike during his daughter's wedding, killing Barkawi's family and seemingly Barkawi himself.

Two years later, British Prime Minister James Wilson suddenly dies, and the G7 prepare to attend his funeral in London. Secret Service Director Lynne Jacobs assigns Agent Mike Banning to lead American President Benjamin Asher's overseas security detail, even though Banning's wife Leah is due to give birth in a few weeks. The entourage arrives via Air Force One at Stansted Airport, and Banning arranges an earlier arrival at Somerset House in London via Marine One.

As Asher's Presidential State Car arrives at St Paul's Cathedral, a large army of mercenaries led by Barkawi's son Kamran launch coordinated attacks on the city disguised as Metropolitan Police, the Queen's Guardsmen, and other first responders, killing five world leaders, damaging major landmarks and generating mass panic. Asher's early arrival throws off the St. Paul's attack, and Banning returns him and Jacobs to Marine One. The terrorists destroy the helicopter's escorts with Stinger missiles, forcing the damaged helicopter to crash-land in Hyde Park. Fatally injured, Jacobs makes Banning promise to stay alive for his unborn child, and to punish those responsible for the attack. Banning escorts Asher into the London Underground as the city's power is lost and residents shelter indoors.

In Washington, D.C., American Vice President Allan Trumbull investigates the incident with British authorities while trying to track down the President. He receives a call from Barkawi, still alive and operating in Sanaa. Seeking revenge for the drone strike that killed his daughter, and having poisoned Wilson to lure the G7 to London, Barkawi promises to broadcast Asher's execution online if Kamran captures him. Trumbull orders his staff to locate Barkawi's known terrorist operatives and find any connection to the attack, while British authorities stand down all first responders so any left in the open can be identified as terrorists.

After leaving a sign to be picked up by satellite, Banning leads Asher to an MI6 safe-house, where MI6 Agent Jacquelin "Jax" Marshall briefs them. Marshall receives a voice message from Trumbull that they saw Banning's sign and an extraction team is en route. Security monitors display an approaching Delta Force team, but Banning realizes they have arrived too soon and are actually Barkawi's mercenaries. He fights and kills all of them and drives away with Asher, but their car is struck before they can reach the United States Embassy, and Asher is taken. Banning is rescued by the combined Delta/SAS extraction team, who suspect a spy in the British government.

Trumbull's staff identify a building owned by one of Barkawi's front companies, drawing massive power despite being unoccupied, and realize it is Kamran's headquarters. Banning joins the extraction team to infiltrate the building, arriving seconds before Kamran can decapitate Asher on camera. Kamran escapes when his hacker Sultan Mansoor drops a grenade with his dying breath, forcing Banning to protect Asher from the blast. Banning and Asher escape just before the building is destroyed by the Delta Force/SAS squad using an explosive that Mike had planted earlier, killing Kamran and the remaining terrorists. Marshall helps British authorities restore London's security system and confronts MI5 Intelligence Chief John Lancaster, learning that he was Barkawi's mole, having left his security fingerprints in the system. Lancaster claims his motive was to prove that the current military budget left the country vulnerable to terrorism and attempts to convince Marshall to join his cause, but she kills him. Trumbull tells Barkawi that his plan failed, moments before United States federal authorities attack his base with another drone strike, killing Barkawi and every other member of his terrorist group.

Two weeks later, as London recovers, Banning is home spending time with Leah and their newborn child Lynne, named after Jacobs. As Banning contemplates sending a letter of resignation, he watches Trumbull speak on television regarding the recent events, with a message that the U.S. will prevail. Inspired, Banning deletes the letter.

Cast
 Gerard Butler as United States Secret Service Agent and former Army Ranger Mike Banning
 Aaron Eckhart as President Benjamin Asher
 Morgan Freeman as Vice President Allan Trumbull, the former Speaker of the House and acting president, now Vice President of the United States after the death of Charlie Rodriguez
 Alon Moni Aboutboul as Aamir Barkawi, a Pakistani international arms trafficker and terrorist mastermind who is No. 6 on the FBI's 10 Most Wanted list
 Angela Bassett as U.S. Secret Service Director Lynne Jacobs
 Robert Forster as United States Army General Edward Clegg, Chairman of the Joint Chiefs of Staff
 Jackie Earle Haley as White House Deputy Chief of Staff DC Mason
 Melissa Leo as Defense Secretary Ruth Macmillan
 Radha Mitchell as Leah Banning, Mike's wife
 Sean O'Bryan as NSA Deputy Director Ray Monroe
 Waleed Zuaiter as Kamran Barkawi, Aamir Barkawi's son and sub-commander
 Charlotte Riley as MI6 Agent Jacquelin Marshall
 Colin Salmon as Sir Kevin Hazard, Commissioner (credited as Chief) of the Metropolitan Police
 Bryan Larkin as SAS Commander Will Davies
 Patrick Kennedy as MI5 Counter-Intelligence Chief John Lancaster
 Mehdi Dehbi as Sultan Mansoor, the terrorist hacker
 Adel Bencherif as Raza Mansoor, Sultan's brother and a terrorist
 Michael Wildman as United States Secret Service Agent Voight
 Andrew Pleavin as United States Secret Service Agent Bronson
 Deborah Grant as Doris, Leah's mother
 Clarkson Guy Williams as British Prime Minister Leighton Clarkson, the current Prime Minister of the United Kingdom after Wilson's death.
 Penny Downie as Home Secretary Rose Kenter
 Philip Delancy as French President Jacques Mainard, the President of France who is killed by a cargo ship planted with explosives, making him the final world leader to die.
 Alex Giannini as Italian Prime Minister Antonio Gusto, the Prime Minister of Italy who is the fourth world leader to be killed by an explosion caused by terrorists at Westminster Abbey. It was Giannini's last movie role before his death on October 2, 2015.
 Elsa Mollien as Mrs Viviana Gusto, Antonio Gusto's wife
 Nancy Baldwin as German Chancellor Agnes Bruckner, the Chancellor of Germany who is killed by terrorists disguised as London Police and British Royal Guards, making her the second world leader to be killed.
 Nigel Whitmey as Canadian Prime Minister Robert Bowman, the Prime Minister of Canada who is the first G7 leader to die when a terrorist disguised as a police officer plants a bomb in his limousine
 Julia Montgomery Brown as Mrs Bowman, Robert Bowman's wife
 Tsuwayuki Saotome as Japanese Prime Minister Tsutomu Nakushima, the Prime Minister of Japan who is third world leader to be killed when suicide bombers driving ambulances destroy Chelsea Bridge while on traffic, resulting in his death when he falls into Thames River.

In addition, the MSNBC news anchor Lawrence O'Donnell appears, uncredited, as an unnamed news anchor reporting on the developments in London.

Production

Casting
In October 2013, it was announced that Butler, Eckhart, Freeman, Bassett, Leo, Forster and Mitchell would reprise their roles from Olympus Has Fallen. Production had been scheduled to begin in May 2015 in London, with Creighton Rothenberger and Katrin Benedikt returning to write the script. Director Antoine Fuqua, however, did not return, due to his commitments with The Equalizer. On May 1, 2014, it was announced Focus Features had acquired distribution rights to the sequel, and would release the film on October 2, 2015. On August 18, 2014, it was announced that Charlie Countryman director Fredrik Bond would take over direction from Fuqua, but Bond left the film on September 18, six weeks before the shooting was to begin. On September 28, director Babak Najafi signed on to direct the film. On October 10, Jackie Earle Haley joined the film to play Deputy Chief Mason. On November 4, 2014, in a press release confirming that filming had started, it was also confirmed that Sean O'Bryan was reprising his role from the first film, while Alon Aboutboul, Charlotte Riley and Waleed Zuaiter were also in the cast. On November 12, Mehdi Dehbi joined the film to play Sultan Mansoor, the youngest of three brothers whose life has been forever changed after a drone strike. Scotsman Bryan Larkin, who plays SAS Commander Will Davies, joined the cast as a "posh English guy", but Najafi and Butler made an on-set decision to have him use his natural Scottish accent.

Filming
Principal photography began on October 24, 2014, in London. Four weeks of shooting were to take place, involving actors Freeman, Eckhart, Bassett and Melissa Leo, before a break for Christmas. Butler and Angela Bassett were seen filming in Somerset House. Production also took place at Pinewood Studios. Butler stated in an interview that the movie was also filmed in India and was to continue in Bulgaria. Then President of Bulgaria, Rosen Plevneliev, visited the set of London Has Fallen during filming at the Boyana Film Studios in Bulgaria. Filming lasted through April 2015.

Score
The music was composed and conducted by Trevor Morris, who provided the score for the first film. The record was released on March 4, 2016, by Back Lot Music. The score was recorded at Abbey Road Studios with The Chamber Orchestra of London.

Release
On May 20, 2015, Focus Features relaunched their Gramercy Pictures label for action, horror, and science fiction releases, with London Has Fallen being one of Gramercy's first titles. The film was planned for an October 2, 2015 release; however, on June 12, 2015, it was announced that the film had been moved back to January 22, 2016, to avoid competition with The Martian, which swapped its original November 25 release date with Victor Frankenstein. The timing of the release was criticized as "insensitive" by the Chair of the Tavistock Square Memorial Trust, Philip Nelson, as it coincided with the week of the 10th anniversary of the 7 July 2005 London bombings, in which 52 people were killed, and with the 2015 Sousse attacks, in which 30 British nationals were killed. On September 16, 2015, the film's release was moved back again to March 4, 2016, because the studios needed more time to finish the film's visual effects.

Home media
London Has Fallen was released on Blu-ray and DVDS on June 14, 2016.

Reception

Box office
London Has Fallen grossed $62.7 million in North America and $143.2 million in other territories for a worldwide total of $205.8 million, against a budget of $60 million. The film outgrossed its predecessor's total of $170 million.

In the United States and Canada, pre-release tracking suggested the film would gross $20–23 million from 3,490 theaters in its opening weekend, alongside Zootopia and Whiskey Tango Foxtrot. The film made $850,000 from its Thursday night previews and $7.6 million on its first day. It went on to gross $21.6 million in its opening weekend, finishing second at the box office behind Zootopia ($75 million).

Critical response
On Rotten Tomatoes, the film has an approval rating of 28% based on 197 reviews, with an average rating of 4.10/10. The site's critical consensus reads, "London Has Fallen traps a talented cast—and all who dare to see it—in a mid-1990s basic-cable nightmare of a film loaded with xenophobia, and threadbare action-thriller clichés." On Metacritic, the film has a score of 28 out of 100, based on reviews from 35 critics, indicating "generally unfavorable reviews". Audiences polled by CinemaScore gave the film an average grade of "A−" on an A+ to F scale, the same score as the first film.

Ignatiy Vishnevetsky of The A.V. Club wrote: "A murky, brain-dead stab-a-thon packed with so many inane chases, laughable special effects, and mismatched stock footage shots that it begs to be made into a drinking game, London Has Fallen is one of those rare films that is good at absolutely nothing." The A.V. Club later picked it as their worst film of the year.

Controversy
Variety described London Has Fallen as "effortlessly racist" invoking "familiar Islamophobia", a "terrorsploitation" fantasy designed to spread fear after the November 2015 Paris attacks, and "ugly, reactionary fear-mongering."
Meanwhile, The Hollywood Reporter styled it as "major world capitals destruction porn sub-genre" that feeds a "paranoia".

The film has been called "extremely insensitive" by families of the victims of the 7/7 bombings after an early trailer was released ahead of the 10th anniversary of the attacks.

Sequel

On October 26, 2016, it was announced that a sequel titled Angel Has Fallen was in development, with Gerard Butler reprising his role, as well as once again acting as a producer on the film.

On July 25, 2017, Ric Roman Waugh was announced as director for Angel Has Fallen. On January 10, 2018, Holt McCallany joined the cast as Wade Jennings, an ex-military turned head of a technology company, but was replaced later by Danny Huston. On January 18, 2018, Jada Pinkett Smith and Tim Blake Nelson were confirmed to appear in Angel Has Fallen. On February 13, 2018, Piper Perabo joined the cast. Filming started on February 7, 2018 in Virginia Water Lake.

The film was released on August 23, 2019.

See also
 List of fictional prime ministers of the United Kingdom

References

External links
 
 
 
 

2016 action thriller films
2016 films
2010s action thriller films
American action thriller films
American political thriller films
American sequel films
2010s English-language films
Films about fictional presidents of the United States
American films about revenge
Films about terrorism in Europe
Films about the Secret Intelligence Service
Films about the Special Air Service
Films directed by Babak Najafi
Films set in Essex
Films set in London
Films set in Manila
Films set in Nevada
Films set in New York City
Films set in Pakistan
Films set in the White House
Films set in Tokyo
Films set in Washington, D.C.
Films set in Yemen
Films set on the London Underground
Films shot in Bulgaria
Films shot in India
Films shot in London
Films about Delta Force
MI5 in fiction
FilmDistrict films
Nu Image films
Focus Features films
Gramercy Pictures films
Has Fallen
Drone films
Films about the United States Secret Service
Films shot at Pinewood Studios
2010s American films